Vriesea correia-araujoi is a plant species in the genus Vriesea. This species is endemic to Brazil.

References

correia-araujoi
Flora of Brazil